Assen Emilov Blatechki (born 22 March 1971) is a Bulgarian actor.

Acting and television career
Blatechki appeared in a number of Bulgarian films including Steps in the Sand" (Bulgarian: Стъпки в пясъка) and The Foreigner (Bulgarian: Чужденецът). He has also taken roles in foreign films.

Blatechki is also a TV presenter and has been a judge on Bulgaria Searches for a Talent.

Sports achievements
Blatechki participated in numerous sports, in particular karate. He was the karate champion of Bulgaria between 1989 and 1992.

Personal life

Blatechki and actress Dilyana Popova have one son. He also has a daughter, Katerina, from his previous marriage to Katerina Goranova.

References

External links
 

Living people
1971 births
21st-century Bulgarian male actors
Bulgarian male film actors
Male actors from Sofia